This is a list of colleges and universities in California.

Federal institutions

Graduate institutions
 Naval Postgraduate School (Monterey)

Other academic institutions
 Defense Language Institute (Monterey)

State institutions

Two-year institutions

 See: List of California Community Colleges

Four-year institutions

University of California

*University of California, Los Angeles was founded in 1882 as the southern branch of the California State Normal School. It joined the University of California system in 1919 as the southern branch of the University of California.

**University of California, Santa Barbara was founded in 1891 as an independent teachers' college. It joined the University of California system in 1944.

California State University

*California Polytechnic State University, San Luis Obispo was founded as a vocational high school. It became a vocational school in 1924, and then started awarding bachelor's degrees in 1940.

**California State Polytechnic University, Pomona, was founded as a southern branch of California State Polytechnic University, San Luis Obispo in 1938, but became independent in 1966.

State graduate institutions

Private colleges and universities

List of defunct institutions

See also

 List of college athletic programs in California
 Higher education in the United States
 List of American institutions of higher education
 List of recognized higher education accreditation organizations
 List of colleges and universities
 List of colleges and universities by country
 List of colleges and universities in San Francisco
 List of colleges and universities in the San Francisco Bay Area
 List of colleges and universities in southern California

References

External links
 Department of Education listing of accredited institutions in California

 
Colleges and universities
California